Andoany, formerly and more commonly known as Hell-Ville (after Anne Chrétien Louis de Hell), is a city in Diana Region, Madagascar with a population estimated at 39,500 in 2013. It lies on the island of Nosy Be, of which it is the capital.

Reference

Populated places in Diana Region